The Chaos is the fourth album by English post-punk revival band The Futureheads. It was released on 26 April 2010. The album is the band's second on their label Nul Records, and was preceded by a download-only single, 'Struck Dumb', on 2 December 2009.

Style 
The track "Struck Dumb", an example of the band's "classic angular guitar-rock", has been described as "a blast of pop-punk energy". As Phil Mongredien of Q magazine put it, though, in The Chaos, as in This Is Not the World, the emphasis is "on the big radio-friendly choruses, four-part choruses given a euphoric dimensions to their punk-influenced sound, with less of the earlier complex angularity".

Track listing
"The Chaos" – 4:09
"Struck Dumb" – 2:50
"Heartbeat Song" – 2:29
"Stop the Noise" – 2:31
"The Connector" – 2:56
"I Can Do That" – 3:42
"Sun Goes Down" – 3:52
"This Is the Life" – 2:55
"The Baron" – 3:11
"Dart at the Map" – 4:04
"Jupiter" – 6:23
HMV exclusive bonus tracks
"Bricks & Stones"
"Local Man of the World"

On both the normal version and the HMV version, there is a hidden track, "Living On Light", placed after the end of the final track on each release.

Charts

References

The Futureheads albums
2010 albums
Nul Records albums